Elek is a given name. Notable people with the given name include:

Elek Bacsik (1926–1993), Hungarian-born American jazz guitarist and violinist
Elek Imredy (1912–1994), Hungarian sculptor
Elek Köblös (1887–1938), Hungarian and Romanian political leader
Elek Nyilas (born 1969), Hungarian football player
Elek Schwartz (1908–2000), Romanian football player
Elek Straub (born 1944), Hungarian engineer, consultant, investor, philanthropist and businessman

See also
Elek (surname)